Gharibwal railway station is located at Gharibwal in Pakistan.

See also
 List of railway stations in Pakistan
 Pakistan Railways

References

Railway stations in Jhelum District
Railway stations in Pakistan